The English Bread Book is an English cookery book by Eliza Acton, first published in 1857. The work consists of a history of bread making in England, improvements to the process developed in Europe, an examination of the ingredients used and recipes of different types of bread.

Book

In 1845 the former poet Eliza Acton published Modern Cookery for Private Families, a work that was aimed at the English middle classes. A chapter within the book provides bread making and recipes for various styles of bread. Acton undertook a re-write of the book in 1855, but was disappointed that she had not been able to add as much information about bread making into the work as she wanted to. Instead she decided, despite her increasingly poor health, that she would take on the subject in a new work, The English Bread-Book For Domestic Use. Published in May 1857, this is not a recipe book along the same lines as Modern Cookery, but is described by Hardy as "a serious, scientific study ... much darker in tone than her previous work". It consists of a history of bread making in England, improvements made in Europe, an examination of the ingredients used and recipes of different types of bread. Acton also included information about the adulteration of bread by flour millers and bakers of the time, which included the addition of alum and what she called "other deleterious substances". The book was focussed on British bread and, in her preface, Acton wrote "Bread is a first necessity of life to the great mass of the English people; being in part the food of all—the chief food of many—and almost the sole food of many more." She devotes a whole chapter to the approach to bread and bread making in France, Germany and Belgium, and the book contains recipes for German pumpernickel, French baguettes, Italian polenta bread, Turkish rolls and Indian breads.

Contents
The following list refers to the 1857 edition.

Preface
Contents

Part One
Bread, its value
Adulteration of bread, and its consequences
Large institutions established abroad
Gluten
To remove the taint of must from wheat
Different varieties of bread-corn

Part Two
Outline of bread making
General rules for baking bread
Making dough
Bread recipes

Reception
The unknown reviewer for The Literary Gazette wrote a favourable review of The English Bread Book, which was also copied in full in The Manchester Guardian. The reviewer called Acton a "clever author", and praised the inclusion of "the whole philosophy and practice, as well as the history of the subject of bread-making, in its plain and fancy forms". In a review in The Glasgow Herald, the critic considered the book "excellent, and we trust to be popular". Readers of the book, the reviewer thought, will become possessed of a store of useful knowledge, as well as scientific as practical, upon a question which is essentially that of every man, woman and child in the wide universe".

In her work, English Bread and Yeast Cookery,  Elizabeth David writes that The English Bread Book heavily influenced and informed her work, and she owes Acton a debt for it. The food writer Elizabeth Ray observes that the book was less successful than Modern Cookery, and was only reprinted in 1990. Although the first edition had "Bread-Book" hyphenated, most subsequent editions did not.

Notes and references

Notes

References

Sources

 
 
 
 
 
 
 
 
 
  
 

1857 books
19th-century British cookbooks
History of English cuisine